Sanudo may refer to:

Angelo Sanudo (died 1262), the second Duchy of the Archipelago from 1227
Cesar Sanudo (1943–2011), American professional golfer who played on the PGA Tour and the Senior PGA Tour
Cristina Sanudo, Dogaressa of Venice by marriage to the Doge Cristoforo Moro (1462–1471)
Fiorenza I Sanudo, Lady of Milos (died 1397), lady of the island of Milos in Frankish Greece
Florence Sanudo (died 1371), daughter and successor as the seventh Duchess of John I, Duke of the Archipelago, in 1362, reigning with her second husband until her death
Guglielmazzo Sanudo, Lord of Gridia (fl. between 1349 and 1362), was a Lord of Gridia
John I Sanudo (died 1362), the sixth Duke of the Archipelago from 1341 to his death
Marco I Sanudo (1153–1220), the creator and first Duke of the Duchy of the Archipelago, after the Fourth Crusade
Marco II Sanudo (died 1303), the third Duke of the Archipelago from 1262 to his death
Marco Sanudo, Lord of Gridia, Lord of Gridia, a fief in Andros
Marco Sanudo, Lord of Milos, Lord of the island of Milos in Frankish Greece
Maria Sanudo, Lady of Andros (died 1426), Lady of Andros
Nicholas I Sanudo (died 1341), the fifth Duke of the Archipelago from 1323 to his death
Nicholas II Sanudo (died 1374), called Spezzabanda, Lord of Gridia (a fief in Andros) and eighth Consort Duke of the Archipelago
William I Sanudo (died 1323), the fourth Duke of the Archipelago from 1303 to his death

See also
Marino Sanudo Torsello (1260–1338), Venetian statesman and geographer
Sangudo
Sanguedo
Palazzo Sanudo, San Polo